Dos Pueblos High School is a public high school located in Goleta, California, northwest of Santa Barbara. Located adjacent to the foothills on the edge of the Goleta Valley in an area known as El Encanto Heights, it serves a student body of approximately 2,300 in grades 9-12. It is one of three comprehensive high schools in the Santa Barbara Unified School District.

Dos Pueblos High School, ("DP" or "DPHS"), is a National Blue Ribbon School. Dos Pueblos' school mascot is the "Charger" as well as Charlie the Charger Horse. The school has undergone recent renovations including finishing of the football stadium, as well as the building of a Broadway-sized theater, an Olympic size pool, and a  engineering facility.

In 2012, Newsweek ranked Dos Pueblos High School as 597 within the top 1000 high schools in America, and 127 in the state of California. Newsweek based its ranking on several criteria, including its graduation rate (93%), percentage of graduates attending college (95%), number of AP/IB tests per student (0.5), average AP test score (3.4), average SAT score (1690), average ACT score (26.5), and the percentage of students receiving subsidized lunches (28%). Dos Pueblos is considered the best high school in the Santa Barbara area by a wide margin.

Student Ethnicity
During the 2013–2014 school year, there were 2,140 students. 41.6% of students were White (not Hispanic), 43.3% were Hispanic or Latino, 7.2% were Asian, 1.4% were African, 0.3% were Native American, and 0.1% were Pacific Islander. 4.5% were multi-racial or declined to state.

Academic programs
Dos Pueblos is home to the Engineering Academy; the majority of students participate in a curriculum that includes vocational, college preparation, and Advanced Placement courses.

Dos Pueblos Engineering Academy
The Dos Pueblos Engineering Academy is a four-year program at Dos Pueblos High School, founded by MacArthur Fellowship winner Amir Abo-Shaeer. The Engineering Academy offers classes in machining, physics, industrial design, programming, and CAD. The Engineering Academy follows a philosophy of project-based learning; over the course of four years, students complete many projects including a mobile, a light sculpture, and a Kinetic Sculpture. During their senior year, students design a mechatronics art installation for display in the Bay Area Maker Faire. In the past, the seniors built a robot to compete in the FIRST Robotics Competition. The (now retired) FIRST team, the D'Penguineers, won several regional competitions and was a regional division finalist in 2008. The Dos Pueblos Engineering Academy's robotics program was the subject of the book The New Cool by Neal Bascomb. In 2010, construction began on a $6 million, 12,000 sq ft building to house the DPEA. Previously, the DPEA had been housed in a small classroom and only accepted 30 students. In 2011, the new building was completed and the DPEA now accepts 104 incoming freshmen.

International Baccalaureate Programme 
DPHS students can participate in the International Baccalaureate Programme, a program that provides students, an opportunity to pursue liberal arts curriculum that is recognized by many colleges and universities. The IB program (as it is commonly known) is particularly popular with those with more general academic interests than the Engineering Academy or other programs can provide.

Dos Pueblos Mock Trial Program
The Dos Pueblos mock trial program gained prominence in 1984, winning the California state championship in that year and again in 1987.  Under the coaching of teacher Ken Larson and attorney coach Chris Kroes, the Dos Pueblos team won several county championships in the 1980s and 1990s with second-place state finishes in 1993, 1994 and 1996. Under coach Bill Woodard (2008–2014), Dos Pueblos won Santa Barbara County titles in 2009, '10, '11 (tied with San Marcos High School), '12, and '13 and finished 13th, 5th, 8th, 2nd, and 9th at state respectively. DP finished second at the 2012 Empire World Invitational—losing in the championship round by a single ballot. A return trip to Empire in 2013 ended with a 4th place world ranking. In 2015, DP's Mock Trial program won first place in the World Championships at Empire.
In 2016, the team took home the state championship title, for the first time in 29 years.

Science Bowl
In April 2010, Dos Pueblos finished 13th in the nation after making it into the "Sweet 16" in the U.S. Department of Energy's National Science Bowl competition in Washington, D.C. United States Secretary of Energy Steven Chu presented the award of a $1,000 check to the Dos Pueblos High School team, including captain Ilan Goodman, Nicholas Su, Sean Risser, Felix Li, Anjian Wu and Coach Chris Jones. In 2008, Dos Pueblos School's Science Bowl was founded and run by John J. Kim for 2 years. Dos Pueblos team took top honors in regional competition in 2008 and 2009, and advanced to the national finals in 2009. On their first appearance in 2008, the DP team took 2nd place in the Kern County Regional Science Bowl. In 2009, the team placed first out of 32 teams in the U.S. Department of Energy's regional Science Bowl competition in Kern County.

Economics Challenge and Capital Markets Contest
Dos Pueblos High School had a successful run in the 2009 Capital Markets contests. One team went to the Los Angeles County competition on Wednesday and another team to the Orange County competition yesterday. The Los Angeles team took third in a close contest, and the Orange County team took first place against a very tough field. Our Orange County champions (all juniors) are, Philip A. Bildner (Cal-Berkeley), Da-bin Ryu (Harvard), Nick Su (Stanford), and Anjian Wu (Caltech).

The Dos Pueblos team also won the 2010 Los Angeles Capital Markets Contest. The team consisted of Haley Araki, Owen Chen, Richard Cheng, and Peter Shao for the Los Angeles Capital Markets Contest on May 27 at the Federal Reserve Bank in Los Angeles. Roland Lewin is the students’ coach/economics teacher. The contest enables students to learn basic economic principles through stock trading and financial analysis, and challenges them to draw conclusions and provide recommendations for addressing national economic issues.

Media Programs

The Image 
The Image Yearbook Staff is a program on campus. The Image has been awarded and recognized nationally: 2008-2013 Look Book Feature, 2012 CSPA Gold Crown Award, 2012 NSPA Best of Show San Antonio, 2012-2013 Book Look Highlighted Book, 2013 CSPA Silver Crown Award, 2013 Design of the Year-Jostens Design Contest, 2013 NSPA First Place; with four marks of Distinction, 2014 NSPA Best of Show San Diego, 2015 NSPA Best of Show Denver. Students work as staff members and editors to produce an annual yearbook on Jostens, an online publication platform. The Image boasts a social media following of over one-third of the school's population.

Performing Arts

Dos Pueblos Theatre Company
The Dos Pueblos Theatre Company, run by former Broadway actor Clark Sayre, challenges its participants and audiences to think, dream and live creatively through visionary programming, collaboration with leading resident theater companies and colleges, ongoing community outreach, interaction with professional artists and unique performance opportunities for all levels and interests. Students have the opportunity to participate directly in the creation of brand new work, gaining invaluable insights into writing, rewriting, professional theater rehearsal processes and character interpretation. The classes offering are Theatre 1/2, Theatre 3/4, Musical Theatre, Acting for TV/Film, and Playwriting.

The Dos Pueblos Theater Company is led by a democratically elected student leadership council. The DPTC Student Officers are elected by their classmates assist in company decisions, outreach, budget, etc. These students help manage theatrical events. Of particular note is Holiday Package, an annual show written, directed and produced by students in a format similar to Saturday Night Live. Most sketches satirize Dos Pueblos, the holiday season, or popular culture at large. The show is also famous for its Male Ballet finale, where 12th grade male students dance in humorous attire to popular music. In the 2017-2018 school year a large fire cancelled Holiday Package but Male Ballet was showcased in the Talent Show that same year. Every year DPTC hosts a student-run themed Haunted House in October. As well as Haunted House and Holiday Package, once a semester an "Open Mic Night" is hosted in the theatre classroom.

The construction of a new 749-seat theater was completed in September 2007 and named The Elings Performing Arts Center in 2011 after donor Dr. Virgil Elings. In the Spring of 2008, the DP Theater produced Beauty and the Beast, the first musical in the new theater.  They are one of the 5 high schools in the country to pilot Disney Shows such as Tarzan, Mary Poppins, Peter and the Star Catcher and most recently Newsies. Opening Night was sold out for the production of Tarzan and Newsies. Shows not produced as Disney pilots include Alice in Wonderland, Legally Blonde, In the Heights, Hello, Dolly!, Annie, and The Addams Family. DPTC piloted Grand Duchy and Like You Like It as the first production in the world.

Dos Pueblos Instrumental Music Program

Marching/Concert band
The Dos Pueblos High School Marching Band is the biggest group in the Instrumental Music Program at Dos Pueblos. It comprises drumline, color guard, and horn line, all of whom compete and perform as one group. The Marching Chargers perform at football games as half time entertainment, in parades such as the Santa Barbara Downtown Holiday Parade, and competes against other marching bands within SCSBOA. For one week preceding the beginning of the school year, the band meets every day for band camp. After school starts, the band meets daily to practice music and drill for their field show. Aimee Ware is the head of the program.

Every year the group changes the theme of its show. Previous shows have included "Synergy," "Through the Veil of Night", "An American Portrait", "Flight", The Incredibles, The Phantom of the Opera, Grease, and Les Misérables.

During their "Flight" show in their 2006 season, at the Battle of the Bands competition at Moorpark High School, the band got first place for the first time in more than five years. In 2007 the Dos Pueblos Marching Chargers also won sweepstakes with their show "An American Portrait", beating 17 other bands at the Royal Competition in October.  This is the first time band has won this award in more than 15 years and was a great honor to them.  The Drumline also got the first place and high Percussion award at the Royal Competition. In 2008, the band received sweepstakes again and high music awards at the Royal Competition.

For the 2010 season, the show was "Echoes of Childhoods Past", composed and arranged by Lozell Henderson and including "In My Life" by the Beatles, The Twilight Zone theme song, the Looney Tunes theme song, The Simpsons theme song and "We're Not Gonna Take It" by Twisted Sister.  In the 2011 marching band season, Lozell Henderson wrote "American Anthems". the show features a baton twirler, traditional songs of the United States, and a strong sense of American pride. The 2013 season's show was titled "Emerald", with drum major Andrew Barone, drum captain Tommy Soto, horn sergeant Aidan Hovey, and assistant drum major Brandon Phung.

The 2014 show was titled "Prism" and was entirely arranged by Lozell Henderson. The 2015 season featured a show entitled "Light as a Feather" featuring music from American jazz pianist Chick Corea, and the drum major was Brandon Dutcher. The 2016 show was entitled "Behind The Walls" with drum major Annebel van der Meulen and featured music "Writings on the Wall" by Sam Smith. The 2017 show was entitled "Music From the Movies: James Bond 007" and features drum major Sam Chase. It includes music from the movies of James Bond. This band was ranked 7th before going to the SCSBOA championships, and placed 5th at 2A championships. The 2018 production was entitled "World of Metal: 16 Psyche", and features drum major Taj Wahab. This show did not advance to championship competition, receiving 14th place in 2A. The 2019 production is entitled "Category VI: The Black Swan," and, as with the year before, did not place high enough to go to SCSBOA championships. However, the 2019 season marked the first time in recent years that the marching band had more than one drum major and more than one player with Drum Corps International experience.

The marching band has produced members of the Blue Devils, Carolina Crown, Santa Clara Vanguard, Cavaliers,  Mandarins, Academy, Santa Clara Vanguard Cadets, Pacific Crest, and Genesis.

During second semester, the band splits into smaller groups. The Horn Line becomes a performing concert band, the Color Guard becomes Winter Guard, and the Drumline becomes their own performing group.

Dance Guard/Winter Guard
Dos Pueblos Dance Guard teach students at DP the fine arts of the competitive sport, Dance Guard (Color/Winter Guard or Tall Flags). Participants spin rifles, sabers and flags with the Dos Pueblos Marching Band in the fall. The Color Guard compete with other schools in the Winter Guard Association of Southern California (WGASC) in the winter/ spring in the Scholastic AAA division. Past shows include: 2015-“My Sweetest Friend”, 2016-“Letters Across The Sea”, 2017-“Where I Started” including the song “Down In The Valley” by The Head and The Heart, and 2018-“Pure Imagination” including a mix up of “Pure Imagination” by Adam Levine. At their prelims competition in April 2019, the team scored a 78.23 placing 3rd place with their show “Flicker”.

Jazz Ensemble
The Dos Pueblos HS Jazz Ensemble is the reigning Reno Jazz Festival champion. These young men and women perform at a variety of venues in the Santa Barbara area, as well as the Reno Jazz Festival, and other Community College and High School jazz festivals on the central coast. A few students in this band even take on the responsibility of producing the annual Dos Pueblos High School Jazz Festival, which will be in its 40th year in March 2009. The 39th Festival featured thirteen competing bands from Southern California and was followed by a benefit concert for the new theatre, which all the local district high school and Santa Barbara City College bands participated in.

As well as participating at jazz festivals, the Jazz Ensemble regularly plays at the local Elks' Lodge. The band plays from a classic repertoire of danceable swing tunes. The Ensemble is available for hire in the Santa Barbara area.

There is also a smaller jazz combo. It is partially student run and emphasis is placed more on individual improvisation and expression, rather than ensemble playing.

Orchestra
The Dos Pueblos High School Orchestra gives the opportunity for high school string and wind players in 9-12 grades to learn and rehearse a variety of music as a group. Dos Pueblos is the only high school in the Santa Barbara Unified School District with an Orchestra, and the number of members have been growing each new school year. The orchestra performs at their Winter and Spring Music Concerts onstage at Elings Performing Arts Center. Some years, the group also performs at Disneyland during Disney Magic Music Days. "The class emphasizes the fundamentals of orchestral playing and all around musicianship, including proper tone production, knowledge of key signatures and their scales, technique, sight reading, and the performance of intermediate and advanced level high school orchestral literature." For more information, visit the Dos Pueblos Instrumental Music Program's website.

Dos Pueblos Vocal Music Department

A Capella and Mixed Chorus
A beginner and an intermediate choir, open to 9-12 grades, that works on performance and vocal technique. Sight-reading, vocal techniques such as proper breathing, diction, tone quality, blend and pitch will be skills gained and honed. Both the Dos Pueblos A Capella Choir and The Dos Pueblos Mixed Chorus join the Madrigals and The DP Jazz Choir and Combo for a Winter and Spring Concert. The Concerts are held at the Elings Performing Arts Center.

Jazz Choir and Combo
The Dos Pueblos Jazz Choir and Combo is an honor performing group of singers and instrumentalists from 9th-12th grades, who with instructor approval, perform both in conjunction with the Madrigals 2 and on their own as an instrumental ensemble. They not only perform in the Winter and Spring Vocal Music Concerts but have also been asked to record songs at a professional studio in Santa Barbara.  The Jazz Choir and Combo is the ensemble that competes at the Reno Jazz Festival and also at Cuesta College's Vocal Jazz Competition each year. They also sang onstage with Foreigner, recorded 5 songs sold on iTunes, and met and sang for Katy Perry, who attended Dos Pueblos as a ninth grader.

Athletics
School teams play in the Channel League, and thus are eligible for a California Interscholastic Federation championship. Dos Pueblos is probably best known for their excellent Girls Water Polo Program, which has won 5 CIF titles in the past 15 years and produced three Olympic Gold Medalists.

Football
The furthest Dos Pueblos has reached in CIF playoffs was in 2001 Division 4, and 2017 Division 10. The 2001 team were CIF Division 4 runners-up and finished with an 11 - 3 record. The 2001 team overcame many on, and off the field issues on their way to a record setting season for DP Football in the ultra competitive Division 4. The Chargers are the 2010 Channel League and City champions. Dos Pueblos beat rival San Marcos 34-7 and Santa Barbara 27-7 to win the City Championship, an unofficial title amongst Channel League teams from Santa Barbara County. They went undefeated in Channel League, beating Ventura 30-27 to win their first league title since 1979. In the 2011 season they were defeated by Ventura in an excitingly close match, but defeated everyone else in the Santa Barbara/Goleta area, thus being back-to-back City Champs. The 2017 Charger football team managed to make it to the CIF Southern Section Division 10 Finals, losing in a nail-bitingly close game to Quartz Hill and finishing with a record 12-2 season. That proved to be Dos Pueblos’ best playoff run in the history of the school and successfully surpassed the 2001 team's season success.

Boys' soccer
The 1983 boys' soccer team won the CIF Championship. Although the championship game with Camarillo HS ended with the score knotted at 3-3, the match was officially declared over after two overtime periods. Oddly, that year there was no method for ending a tie such as with penalty kicks. Therefore, co-champions were officially declared. This was the first CIF 4-A Championship ever won by a Dos Pueblos HS athletic team.

The coach was Jorge Lorca. Players on that team were Chuck Adam, Jose "Yo-Yo" Banuelos, Alan Carlin, Pedro Guillen, Gary Hoag, Paul Hovda, Gerardo Jimenez, Mike McGrath, Mickey Miranda, Paul "Babe" Mocker, Abel Pizano, Rafael Rios, Lewis Stark, James Stupak, Andy Tangel, Scott Valianos, Fred Wilms, Brian Wolf and Brian Zimmerman. (Added to the postseason roster were Bruce Shumikowski, John Blaney and Michael Blaney.)

On November 29, 2008, the team celebrated the 25th anniversary of the championship with a game against a squad of current varsity players and recent alumni. A celebration of the lifetime achievements and overall contributions to soccer in Goleta of Joe Nunez, Jorge Lorca, R. Cam Camarena, and Abe Jahadhmy capped the weekend. Tributes of applause, gratitude, tears (and shirts signed by the players) were bestowed on these four individuals in recognition of the deeply valuable contributions each has made to the communities, schools, and student-athletes of Goleta Valley.

Girls' Volleyball
The girls' volleyball team won the CIF title in 2009 and are currently the reigning Channel League Champions. Coach Meagan O'Carroll is the reigning Coach of the Year.

Boys' Volleyball 
The boys' volleyball team won Division II CIF in 1998 under legendary coach Mike Beresford, who has accrued more than 500 career wins as a girls and boys varsity head coach in Santa Barbara and Goleta. In 2003 Beresford left the program in excellent hands with Chris Hughes assuming the role as head coach. Coach Hughes led the Chargers to back to back Division II semifinals in 2007 & 2008, as well as a Channel League title in 2010. Coach Hughes handed over the reins to one of his and Beresfords former players Ehren Hug in 2014. Coach Hug lead the Chargers to a Channel League title in 2016 behind the left arm of Eli Wopat, who played at Stanford University on the men's volleyball team. In the 2018 season, Hug lead the Chargers to another Channel League title with league MVP setter Parker Crossland and Outside Hitter Curren Malholtra, who is attending a Division 1 volleyball team (UCSD) in the fall.

Boys' Cross Country
In the 2012 season the Boys' Cross Country team finished 4th at the Division 2 State Championships. Bryan Fernandez went undefeated on the season, winning the CIF Southern Section and State Titles to go along with back to back County and League titles. In 2013, led by Cole Smith, the team finished 2nd at the Southern Section Finals and 3rd at the State Championships after winning the Channel League and Santa Barbara County Championships for the 2nd year in a row. Smith won the individual Channel League and County titles. 

 In 2021-22, both the boys and girls teams qualified for the state tournament, cementing their status as the best cross-country programs in the Santa Barbara area.

Boys' Baseball
2016 was the fifth consecutive season that the Chargers earned a Channel League Championship. The team defied the odds and advanced to the CIF Division 2 Semi-Finals.

In 2013, four-year varsity ace, Gabe Speier was drafted in the 18th round by the Boston Red Sox, passing on his full-time offer to nationally ranked UCSB. Speier is currently playing in the Arizona Diamondbacks organization, having left the Detroit Tigers, the organization for which 2008 Graduate, James McCann, plays.

Administration
William Woodard is the Principal at Dos Pueblos. 2021-22 will be his 6th year in that role.

The school has three assistant principals, Stephanie Henderson, Dare Holdren, and Shannon Yorke, as well as a Dean of Student Engagement, Bethany Bodenhamer.

Notable alumni

 Alex Filippenko (class of 1976) — astrophysicist and professor of astronomy at the University of California, Berkeley
 Chip Foose — owner of Foose Design and former star of the reality TV series Overhaulin
 Tyler Fredrickson — NFL player for the Oakland Raiders and Washington Redskins, later a contestant on Survivor's 30th season
 Meg Gardiner — Edgar Award-winning author and best-selling novelist primarily of thrillers, and crime procedurals
 Malynda Hale — singer, songwriter, actress, entrepreneur
 Samantha Hill — 2016 Olympic Gold medalist in women's water polo
 Ben Howland — former head coach of the UCLA Bruins men's basketball team and current head coach of Mississippi State
 Robin Lim - midwife and the founder of Yayasan Bumi Sehat
 James McCann — starting catcher for the New York Mets and a 2019 MLB All-Star
 Howard McGillin — two-time Tony Award-nominated stage actor and singer and three-time Drama Desk nominee; holds record for portraying "Phantom of the Opera" on Broadway more than 2,500 times; also performed on London's West End, in films and TV
 Ryan Mendez — guitarist for the band Yellowcard
 Larry Moriarty — football player for Notre Dame and in the NFL
 Kiley Neushul — 2016 Olympic Gold medalist in women's water polo
 Steve Odom — football player for Utah and in the NFL
 Douglas Partie — member of United States men's national volleyball team that won gold medal at 1988 Summer Olympics
 Katy Perry -  American singer and songwriter who has received various awards, including four Guinness World Records, five American Music Awards, a Brit Award, and a Juno Award
 Jeffrey Peterson — businessman and computer programmer, founder of Quepasa
 Derrick Plourde — drummer, musician and artist, member of Lagwagon, one of the most respected musicians in the modern punk scene
 Scott Randall — former professional baseball player (Cincinnati Reds)
 Stephen Randolph — former professional baseball player (Arizona Diamondbacks, Houston Astros)
 Ben Rattray — creator and CEO of change.org as well as one of Time Magazine's 100 most influential people
 Kyle Shotwell — football player for Cal Poly and in the NFL with the Kansas City Chiefs
 Patricia Soltysik — Symbionese Liberation Army member
 Gabe Speier — MLB pitcher
 Julyan Stone — former NBA player for the Denver Nuggets and Toronto Raptors
 Kim Wilson — blues singer and harmonica player, most notably with the Fabulous Thunderbirds
 Benjamin (Ben) Bishop — honorary service award winner

References

External links

High schools in Santa Barbara County, California
Goleta, California
International Baccalaureate schools in California
Public high schools in California
1966 establishments in California
Educational institutions established in 1966